Arwel Robson (born 21 February 1997) is a Welsh rugby union player who plays for Dragons regional team as a fly half.

Robson made his debut for the Dragons regional team in 2016 having previously played for Newport RFC.

Robson played his junior and youth rugby at Nelson RFC and Penallta RFC and was a member of the 2014 Penallta Youth side which won the Welsh Youth Cup. Robson scored a try in the final at the Millennium Stadium.

References

External links 
Dragons profile

Welsh rugby union players
Dragons RFC players
Newport RFC players
Living people
1997 births
Rugby union fly-halves
Rugby union fullbacks
Cornish Pirates players
Jersey Reds players